Curtell Howard Motton (September 24, 1940 – January 21, 2010) was an American professional baseball player. He played in Major League Baseball as an outfielder from  through , most notably as a member of the Baltimore Orioles dynasty that won three consecutive American League pennants from 1969 to 1971 and, won the World Series in 1970. He also played for the Milwaukee Brewers and the California Angels.

Minors
Motton played baseball at Encinal High School in Alameda, California, the same school that produced Willie Stargell, Tommy Harper, Jimmy Rollins and Dontrelle Willis. He completed his education at Santa Rosa Junior College and the University of California in Berkeley, CA.

Motton signed as an amateur free agent by the Chicago Cubs on July 20, 1961. After only one full campaign with the St. Cloud Rox in 1962, in which he hit .291 with 13 home runs and 69 runs batted in, he was selected by the Orioles in the 1962 first-year draft. Both he and Paul Blair powered the offense of the Harry Dunlop-managed Stockton Ports when they won the 1963 California League championship. Motton led the team in batting with a .333 average.

He spent the next  years away from the Orioles organization when he served in the United States Army at Fort Richardson. He managed to play organized baseball in 1964 with the Alaska Goldpanners of Fairbanks, which also featured Tom Seaver, Graig Nettles and Rick Monday. He returned to the Orioles' farm system in 1965, and made his major league debut during the 1967 season.

Baltimore Orioles
Motton saw the most playing time in his career in 1968 when he platooned in left field with Curt Blefary. For the season, he batted only .198 with eight home runs and 25 RBIs, however, perhaps as a sign of things to come, he set a record by hitting a pinch hit home run in consecutive pinch hit at-bats on May 15 and May 17.

In 1969, infielder Don Buford was converted into an outfielder, relegating Motton to pinch hitting duties. Motton shined in his new role, batting .303 with six home runs and 21 RBIs for the season. Perhaps his most memorable pinch hit at-bat came on October 5 against the Minnesota Twins in the 1969 American League Championship Series. With the score tied at zero in the eleventh inning, Motton singled in Boog Powell for the only run of the game.

1972 season
Motton remained with the Orioles through 1971, winning a World Series with the team in 1970. Prior to the start of the 1972 season, Motton was traded to the Milwaukee Brewers for a player to be named later and cash. Expected to compete for one of the starting outfield jobs, he ended up being beat out by John Briggs and Joe Lahoud. Motton was critical of manager Dave Bristol over his lack of playing time, and was traded to the California Angels for minor league pitcher Archie Reynolds just over a month into the season. He batted just .156 for his two clubs, and began the 1973 season assigned to the Angels' triple A affiliate, the Salt Lake City Angels. After batting just .152 in 28 games for Salt Lake, the Angels released Motton, and he returned to the Orioles. Motton appeared in just seven more games for the Orioles over the next two seasons.

Death
Motton died after a long battle with stomach cancer at his home in Parkton, Maryland, on January 21, 2010. His wife Marti, a retired Baltimore County Police Officer, was by his side.

References

External links

Curt Motton at SABR (Baseball BioProject)
Curt Motton at The Deadball Era

1940 births
2010 deaths
African-American baseball coaches
African-American baseball players
Baltimore Orioles coaches
Baltimore Orioles players
Baltimore Orioles scouts
Baseball players from Louisiana
Birmingham A's players
California Angels players
California Golden Bears baseball players
Deaths from cancer in Maryland
Deaths from stomach cancer
Elmira Pioneers players
Florida Instructional League Orioles players
Fox Cities Foxes players
Major League Baseball first base coaches
Major League Baseball outfielders
Milwaukee Brewers players
People from Parkton, Maryland
Rochester Red Wings players
St. Cloud Rox players
Salt Lake City Angels players
Stockton Ports players
Tiburones de La Guaira players
American expatriate baseball players in Venezuela
Santa Rosa Bear Cubs baseball players
20th-century African-American sportspeople
21st-century African-American people
Alaska Goldpanners of Fairbanks players